Psychedelics are a subclass of hallucinogenic drugs whose primary effect is to trigger non-ordinary mental states (known as psychedelic experiences or psychedelic "trips") and/or an apparent expansion of consciousness. Sometimes, they are called classic hallucinogens, serotonergic hallucinogens, or serotonergic psychedelics, and the term psychedelic is sometimes used more broadly to include various types of hallucinogens or those which are atypical or adjacent to psychedelia such as MDMA or cannabis; this article uses the narrower definition of psychedelics. True psychedelics cause specific psychological, visual, and auditory changes, and oftentimes a substantially altered state of consciousness. Psychedelic states are often compared to meditative, psychodynamic or transcendental types of alterations of mind. The "classical" psychedelics, the psychedelics with the largest scientific and cultural influence, are mescaline, LSD, psilocybin, and DMT. LSD in particular has long been considered the paradigmatic psychedelic compound, to which all other psychedelics are often or usually compared.

Most psychedelic drugs fall into one of the three families of chemical compounds: tryptamines, phenethylamines, or lysergamides (LSD is considered both a tryptamine and lysergamide). They act via serotonin 2A receptor agonism. When compounds bind to serotonin 5-HT2A receptors, they modulate the activity of key circuits in the brain involved with sensory perception and cognition, however, the exact nature of how psychedelics induce changes in perception and cognition via the 5-HT2A receptor is still unknown, although reduction in default mode network activity and increased functional connectivity between regions in the brain as a result may be one of the most relevant pharmacological mechanisms underpinning the psychedelic experience, particularly ego death. The psychedelic experience is often compared to non-ordinary forms of consciousness such as those experienced in meditation, mystical experiences, and near-death experiences, which also appear to be partially underpinned by altered default mode network activity. The phenomenon of ego death is often described as a key feature of the psychedelic experience.

Many psychedelic drugs are illegal worldwide under the UN conventions, with occasional exceptions for religious use or research contexts. Despite these controls, recreational use of psychedelics is common. Legal barriers have made the scientific study of psychedelics more difficult. Research has been conducted, however, and studies show that psychedelics are physiologically safe and rarely lead to addiction. Studies conducted using psilocybin in a psychotherapeutic setting reveal that psychedelic drugs may assist with treating depression, alcohol addiction, and nicotine addiction. Although further research is needed, existing results suggest that psychedelics could be effective treatments for certain forms of psychopathology. A 2022 survey found that 28% of Americans had used a psychedelic at some point in their life.

Etymology and nomenclature

The term psychedelic was coined by the psychiatrist Humphrey Osmond during written correspondence with author Aldous Huxley and presented to the New York Academy of Sciences by Osmond in 1957. It is irregularly derived from the Greek words ψυχή psychḗ 'soul, mind' and δηλείν dēleín 'to manifest', with the intended meaning "mind manifesting," the implication being that psychedelics can reveal unused potentials of the human mind. The term was loathed by American ethnobotanist Richard Schultes but championed by American psychologist Timothy Leary.

Aldous Huxley had suggested his own coinage phanerothyme (Greek phaneroein- "visible" and Greek thymos "soul", thus "visible soul") to Osmond in 1956. Recently, the term entheogenic has come into use to denote the use of psychedelic drugs, as well as various other types of psychoactive substances, in a religious, spiritual, and mystical context.

In 2004, David E. Nichols wrote the following about the nomenclature used for psychedelic drugs:

Robin Carhart-Harris and Guy Goodwin write that the term psychedelic is preferable to hallucinogen for describing classical psychedelics because of the term hallucinogens "arguably misleading emphasis on these compounds' hallucinogenic properties."

While the term psychedelic is most commonly used to refer only to serotonergic hallucinogens, it is sometimes used for a much broader range of drugs, including empathogen–entactogens, dissociatives, and atypical hallucinogens/psychoactives such as Amanita muscaria, Cannabis sativa, Nymphaea nouchali and Salvia divinorum. Thus, the term serotonergic psychedelic is sometimes used for the narrower class. It is important to check the definition of a given source. This article uses the more common, narrower definition of psychedelic.

Examples

 LSD (Lysergic acid diethylamide) is a derivative of lysergic acid, which is obtained from the hydrolysis of ergotamine. Ergotamine is an alkaloid found in the fungus claviceps purpurea, which primarily infects rye. LSD is both the prototypical psychedelic and the prototypical lysergamide. As a lysergamide, LSD contains both a tryptamine and phenethylamine group within its structure. As a result of containing a phenethylamine group LSD agonises dopamine receptors as well as serotonin receptors, making it more energetic in effect in contrast to the more sedating effects of psilocin, which isn't a dopamine agonist.
 Psilocin (4-HO-DMT) is the dephosphorylated active metabolite of the indole alkaloid psilocybin and a substituted tryptamine, which is produced in over 200 species of fungi. Of the Classical psychedelics psilocybin has attracted the greatest academic interest regarding its ability to manifest mystical experiences, although all psychedelics are capable of doing so to variable degrees. O-Acetylpsilocin (4-AcO-DMT) is an acetylated analog of psilocin. Additionally, replacement of a methyl group at the dimethylated nitrogen with an isopropyl or ethyl group yields 4-HO-MIPT and 4-HO-MET, respectively.
 Mescaline (3,4,5-trimethoxyphenethylamine) is a phenethylamine alkaloid found in various species of cacti, the most well known being Peyote (Lophophora williamsii) and San Pedro (Echinopsis pachanoi). Mescaline has effects comparable to those of LSD and psilocybin, albeit with a greater emphasis on colors and patterns.
 DMT (N,N-dimethyltryptamine) is an indole alkaloid found in various species of plants. Traditionally it is consumed by tribes in South America in the form of ayahuasca. A brew is used that consists of DMT-containing plants as well as plants containing MAOIs, specifically harmaline, which allows DMT to be consumed orally without being rendered inactive by monoamine oxidase enzymes in the digestive system. In the Western world DMT is more commonly consumed via the vaporisation of freebase DMT. Whereas Ayahuasca typically lasts for several hours, inhalation has an onset measured in seconds and has effects measured in minutes, being significantly more intense. Particularly in vaporised form, DMT has the ability to cause users to enter a hallucinatory realm fully detached from reality, being typically characterised by hyperbolic geometry, and described as defying visual or verbal description. Users have also reported encountering and communicating with entitites within this hallucinatory state. DMT is the archetypal substituted tryptamine, being the structural scaffold of psilocybin and - to a lesser extent - the lysergamides.
 2C-B (2,5-dimethoxy-4-bromophenethylamine) is a substituted phenthylamine first synthesised in 1974 by Alexander Shulgin. 2C-B is both a psychedelic and a mild entactogen, with its psychedelic effects increasing and its entactogenic effects decreasing with dosage. 2C-B is the most well known compound in the 2C family, their general structure being discovered as a result of modifying the structure of mescaline.

Uses

Traditional 

A number of frequently mentioned or traditional psychedelics such as Ayahuasca (which contains DMT), San Pedro, Peyote, and Peruvian torch (which all contain mescaline), Psilocybe mushrooms (which contain psilocin/psilocybin) and Tabernanthe iboga (which contains the unique psychedelic ibogaine) all have a long and extensive history of spiritual, shamanic and traditional usage by indigenous peoples in various world regions, particularly in Latin America, but also Gabon, Africa in the case of iboga. Different countries and/or regions have come to be associated with traditional or spiritual use of particular psychedelics, such as the ancient and entheogenic use of psilocybe mushrooms by the native Mazatec people of Oaxaca, Mexico or the use of the ayahuasca brew in the Amazon basin, particularly in Peru for spiritual and physical healing as well as for religious festivals. Peyote has also been used for several thousand years in the Rio Grande Valley in North America by native tribes as an entheogen. In the Andean region of South America, the San Pedro cactus (Echinopsis pachanoi) has a long history of use, possibly as a traditional medicine. Archaeological studies have found evidence of use going back two thousand years, to Moche culture, Nazca culture, and Chavín culture. Although authorities of the Roman Catholic church attempted to suppress its use after the Spanish conquest, this failed, as shown by the Christian element in the common name "San Pedro cactus" – Saint Peter cactus. The name is attributed to the belief that just as St Peter holds the keys to heaven, the effects of the cactus allow users "to reach heaven while still on earth." In 2022, the Peruvian Ministry of Culture declared the traditional use of San Pedro cactus in northern Peru as cultural heritage.

Although people of western culture have tended to use psychedelics for either psychotherapeutic or recreational reasons, most indigenous cultures, particularly in South America have seemingly tended to use psychedelics for more supernatural reasons such as divination. This can often be related to “healing” or health as well but typically in the context of finding out what is wrong with the individual; such as using psychedelic states to “identify” a disease and/or its cause, locate lost objects, and identify a victim or even perpetrator of sorcery. In some cultures and regions, even psychedelics themselves, such as ayahuasca and the psychedelic lichen of eastern Ecuador (Dictyonema huaorani) that supposedly contains both 5-MeO-DMT and psilocybin, have also been used by witches and sorcerers to conduct their malicious magic, similarly to nightshade deliriants like brugmansia and latua.

Psychedelic therapy 

Psychedelic therapy (or psychedelic-assisted therapy) is the proposed use of psychedelic drugs to treat mental disorders. As of 2021, psychedelic drugs are controlled substances in most countries and psychedelic therapy is not legally available outside clinical trials, with some exceptions.

The procedure for psychedelic therapy differs from that of therapies using conventional psychiatric medications. While conventional medications are usually taken without supervision at least once daily, in contemporary psychedelic therapy the drug is administered in a single session (or sometimes up to three sessions) in a therapeutic context. The therapeutic team prepares the patient for the experience beforehand and helps them integrate insights from the drug experience afterwards. After ingesting the drug, the patient normally wears eyeshades and listens to music to facilitate focus on the psychedelic experience, with the therapeutic team interrupting only to provide reassurance if adverse effects such as anxiety or disorientation arise.

As of 2022, the body of high-quality evidence on psychedelic therapy remains relatively small and more, larger studies are needed to reliably show the effectiveness and safety of psychedelic therapy's various forms and applications. On the basis of favorable early results, ongoing research is examining proposed psychedelic therapies for conditions including major depressive disorder, and anxiety and depression linked to terminal illness. The United States Food and Drug Administration has granted "breakthrough therapy" status, which expedites the assessment of promising drug therapies for potential approval, to psilocybin therapy for treatment-resistant depression and major depressive disorder.

Recreational

Recreational use of psychedelics is common. A survey published in 2013 found that 13.4% of American adults had used a psychedelic.

Microdosing

Psychedelic microdosing is the practice of using sub-threshold doses (microdoses) of psychedelics in an attempt to improve creativity, boost physical energy level, emotional balance, increase performance on problems-solving tasks and to treat anxiety, depression and addiction.  The practice of microdosing has become more widespread in the 21st century with more people claiming long-term benefits from the practice.

A 2022 study recognized signatures of psilocybin microdosing in natural language and concluded that low amount of psychedelics have potential for application, and ecological observation of microdosing schedules.

Pharmacology
While the method of action of psychedelics is not fully understood, they are known to show affinities for various 5-HT (serotonin) receptors in different ways and levels, and may be classified by their activity at different 5-HT sub-types, particularly 5-HT1A, 5-HT2A, and 5-HT2C. It is almost unanimously agreed that psychedelics produce their effect by acting as strong partial agonists at the 5-HT2A receptors. How this produces the psychedelic experience is unclear, but it is likely that it acts by increasing excitation in the cortex, possibly by specifically facilitating input from the thalamus, the major relay for sensory information input to the cortex. Additionally, researchers discovered that many psychedelics are potent psychoplastogens, compounds capable of promoting rapid and sustained neural plasticity.

Tryptamines

Tryptamine, along with other trace amines, is found in the central nervous system of mammals. It is hypothesized to play a role as a neuromodulator on classical monoamine neurotransmitters, such as dopamine, serotonin, and norepinephrine (epinephrine). Tryptamine acts as a non-selective serotonin receptor agonist to activate serotonin receptors, and a serotonin–norepinephrine–dopamine releasing agent (SNDRA) to release more monoamine neurotransmitter, with a preference for evoking serotonin and dopamine release over norepinephrine (epinephrine) release. Psychedelic tryptamines found in nature include psilocin, DMT, 5-MeO-DMT, and tryptamines that have been synthesized in the laboratory include 4-HO-MET, 4-HO-MiPT, and 5-MeO-DALT.

Phenethylamines
Phenethylamine is also a trace amine but to a lesser extent acts as a neurotransmitter in the human central nervous system (CNS). Phenethylamine instead regulates monoamine neurotransmission by binding to trace amine-associated receptor 1 (TAAR1), which plays a significant role in regulating neurotransmission in dopamine, norepinephrine, and serotonin neurons in the CNS and inhibiting vesicular monoamine transporter 2 (VMAT2) in monoamine neurons. When VMAT2 is inhibited monoamine neurotransmitters such as dopamine cannot be released into the synapse via typical release mechanisms. Mescaline is a naturally occurring psychedelic protoalkaloid of the substituted phenethylamine class.

Lysergamides

Amides of lysergic acid are collectively known as lysergamides, and include a number of compounds with potent agonist and/or antagonist activity at various serotonin and dopamine receptors. Lysergamides contain both Tryptamine and Phenethylamine structure although it is class as a complex Tryptamine. LSD (Lysergic Acid Diethylamide) is one of many lysergamides. A wide range of lysergamides have emerged in recent years, inspired by existing scientific literature. Others, have appeared from chemical research. 1P-LSD is a derivative and functional analogue of LSD and a homologue of ALD-52. It modifies the LSD molecule by adding a propionyl group to the nitrogen molecule of LSD's indole.

Psychedelic experiences

Although several attempts have been made, starting in the 19th and 20th centuries, to define common phenomenological structures of the effects produced by classic psychedelics, a universally accepted taxonomy does not yet exist. At lower doses, features of psychedelic experiences include sensory alterations, such as the warping of surfaces, shape suggestibility, pareidolia and color variations. Users often report intense colors that they have not previously experienced, and repetitive geometric shapes or form constants are common as well. Higher doses often cause intense and fundamental alterations of sensory (notably visual) perception, such as synesthesia or the experience of additional spatial or temporal dimensions. Tryptamines are well documented to cause classic psychedelic states, such as increased empathy, visual distortions (drifting, morphing, breathing, melting of various surfaces and objects), auditory hallucinations, ego dissolution or ego death with high enough dose, mystical, transpersonal and spiritual experiences, autonomous "entity" encounters, time distortion, closed eye hallucinations and complete detachment from reality with a high enough dose. Luis Luna describes psychedelic experiences as having a distinctly gnosis-like quality, and says that they offer "learning experiences that elevate consciousness and can make a profound contribution to personal development." Czech psychiatrist Stanislav Grof studied the effects of psychedelics like LSD early in his career and said of the experience, that it commonly includes "complex revelatory insights into the nature of existence… typically accompanied by a sense of certainty that this knowledge is ultimately more relevant and 'real' than the perceptions and beliefs we share in everyday life." Traditionally, the standard model for the subjective phenomenological effects of psychedelics has typically been based on LSD, with anything that is considered "psychedelic" evidently being compared to it and its specific effects.

During a speech on his 100th birthday, the inventor of LSD, Albert Hofmann said of the drug: "It gave me an inner joy, an open mindedness, a gratefulness, open eyes and an internal sensitivity for the miracles of creation... I think that in human evolution it has never been as necessary to have this substance LSD. It is just a tool to turn us into what we are supposed to be." With certain psychedelics and experiences, a user may also experience an "afterglow" of improved mood or perceived mental state for days or even weeks after ingestion in some cases. In 1898, the English writer and intellectual Havelock Ellis reported a heightened perceptual sensitivity to "the more delicate phenomena of light and shade and color" for a prolonged period of time after his exposure to mescaline. Good trips are reportedly deeply pleasurable, and typically involve intense joy or euphoria, a greater appreciation for life, reduced anxiety, a sense of spiritual enlightenment, and a sense of belonging or interconnectedness with the universe. Negative experiences, colloquially known as "bad trips," evoke an array of dark emotions, such as irrational fear, anxiety, panic, paranoia, dread, distrustfulness, hopelessness, and even suicidal ideation. While it is impossible to predict when a bad trip will occur, one's mood, surroundings, sleep, hydration, social setting, and other factors can be controlled (colloquially referred to as "set and setting") to minimize the risk of a bad trip. The concept of “set and setting” also generally appears to be more applicable to psychedelics than to other types of hallucinogens such as deliriants, hypnotics and dissociative anesthetics.

Classic psychedelics are considered to be those found in nature like psilocybin, DMT, mescaline, and LSD which is derived from naturally occurring ergotamine, and non-classic psychedelics are considered to be newer analogs and derivatives of pharmacophore lysergamides, tryptamine, and phenethylamine structures like 2C-B.  Many of these psychedelics cause remarkably similar effects, despite their different chemical structure. However, many users report that the three major families have subjectively different qualities in the "feel" of the experience, which are difficult to describe. Some compounds, such as 2C-B, have extremely tight "dose curves", meaning the difference in dose between a non-event and an overwhelming disconnection from reality can be very slight. There can also be very substantial differences between the drugs; for instance, 5-MeO-DMT rarely produces the visual effects typical of other psychedelics.

Potential adverse effects

Despite the contrary perception of much of the public, psychedelic drugs are not addictive and are physiologically safe. As of 2016, there have been no known deaths due to overdose of LSD, psilocybin, or mescaline.

Risks do exist during an unsupervised psychedelic experience, however; Ira Byock wrote in 2018 in the Journal of Palliative Medicine that psilocybin is safe when administered to a properly screened patient and supervised by a qualified professional with appropriate set and setting. However, he called for an "abundance of caution" because in the absence of these conditions a range of negative reactions is possible, including "fear, a prolonged sense of dread, or full panic." He notes that driving or even walking in public can be dangerous during a psychedelic experience because of impaired hand-eye coordination and fine motor control. In some cases, individuals taking psychedelics have performed dangerous or fatal acts because they believed they possessed superhuman powers.

Psilocybin-induced states of mind share features with states experienced in psychosis, and while a causal relationship between psilocybin and the onset of psychosis has not been established as of 2011, researchers have called for investigation of the relationship. Many of the persistent negative perceptions of psychological risks are unsupported by the currently available scientific evidence, with the majority of reported adverse effects not being observed in a regulated and/or medical context. A population study on associations between psychedelic use and mental illness published in 2013 found no evidence that psychedelic use was associated with increased prevalence of any mental illness.

Using psychedelics poses certain risks of re-experiencing of the drug's effects, including flashbacks and hallucinogen persisting perception disorder (HPPD). These non-psychotic effects are poorly studied, but the permanent symptoms (also called "endless trip") are considered to be rare.

Serotonin syndrome can be caused by combining psychedelics with other serotonergic drugs, including certain antidepressants, opioids, CNS stimulants (e.g. MDMA), 5-HT1 agonists (e.g. triptans), herbs and others.

Potential therapeutic effects

Psychedelic substances which may have therapeutic uses include psilocybin, LSD, and mescaline. During the 1950s and 1960s, lack of informed consent in some scientific trials on psychedelics led to significant, long-lasting harm to some participants. Since then, research regarding the effectiveness of psychedelic therapy has been conducted under strict ethical guidelines, with fully informed consent and a pre-screening to avoid people with psychosis taking part. Although the history behind these substances has hindered research into their potential medicinal value, scientists are now able to conduct studies and renew research that was halted in the 1970s. Some research has shown that these substances have helped people with such mental disorders as obsessive-compulsive disorder (OCD), post-traumatic stress disorder (PTSD), alcoholism, depression, and cluster headaches.

It has long been known that psychedelics promote neurite growth and neuroplasticity and are potent psychoplastogens. There is evidence that psychedelics induce molecular and cellular adaptations related to neuroplasticity and that these could potentially underlie therapeutic benefits. Psychedelics have also been shown to have potent anti-inflammatory activity and therapeutic effects in animal models of inflammatory diseases including asthma, and cardiovascular disease and diabetes.

Surrounding culture

Psychedelic culture includes manifestations such as psychedelic music, psychedelic art, psychedelic literature, psychedelic film, and psychedelic festivals. Examples of psychedelic music would be rock bands like the Grateful Dead, Jefferson Airplane and The Beatles. Many psychedelic bands and elements of the psychedelic subculture originated in San Francisco during the mid to late 1960s.

Legal status

Many psychedelics are classified under Schedule I of the United Nations Convention on Psychotropic Substances of 1971 as drugs with the greatest potential to cause harm and no acceptable medical uses. In addition, many countries have analogue laws; for example, in the United States, the Federal Analogue Act of 1986 automatically forbids any drugs sharing similar chemical structures or chemical formulas to illicit or prohibited substances if sold for human consumption.

U.S. states such as Oregon and Colorado have also instituted decriminalization and legalization measures of psychedelics  and states like New Hampshire and others are attempting to do the same. J.D. Tuccille argues that increasing rates of use of psychedelics in defiance of the law are likely to result in more widespread legalization and decriminalization of the substances in the United States (as has happened with alcohol and cannabis).

See also

 Aztec use of entheogens
 Bwiti
 Cognitive liberty
 Concord Prison Experiment
 Designer Drugs
 Dissociative drug
 Drug harmfulness
 Entheogenic drugs and the archaeological record
 Entheogenics and the Maya
 Hallucinogenic fish
 Hallucinogenic plants in Chinese herbals
 Hamilton's Pharmacopeia
 History of lysergic acid diethylamide
 Ibogaine
 List of psychedelic plants
 Marsh Chapel Experiment
 Morning glory
 Mystical psychosis
 PiHKAL
 
 Serotonergic cell groups
 Serotonin syndrome
 Tabernanthe iboga
 TiHKAL
 Research chemical
 List of psychedelic drugs
 List of designer drugs

Categories

Notes

References

Further reading
 
 
 
 
 
 
 Winstock, Ar; Timmerman, C; Davies, E; Maier, Lj; Zhuparris, A; Ferris, Ja; Barratt, Mj; Kuypers, Kpc (2021). Global Drug Survey (GDS) 2020 Psychedelics Key Findings Report.

External links 
 Psychedelic Timeline by Tom Frame. Psychedelic Times.
 PsychonautWiki.org a community-driven online encyclopedia.

Drug classes defined by psychological effects
5-HT2A agonists
Hallucinations